Hook Windmill, also known as Old Hook Mill,  is a historic windmill on North Main Street in East Hampton, New York. It was built in 1806 and operated regularly until 1908. One of the most complete of the existing windmills on Long Island, the windmill was sold to the town of East Hampton in 1922. The building was listed on the National Register of Historic Places in 1978 and is part of the North Main Street Historic District. The mill was renamed the "Old Hook Mill" and is open daily to visitors.

Smock Mill

The Windmill is among the 11 other surviving 18th and early 19th century wind-powered gristmills located on Long Island. It was built by Nathaniel Dominy V, a well-known East Hampton craftsman.

The 'Smock' is a reference to a common farmers garment which  lent it's appearance to dutch-style windmills.

History

Nathaniel Dominy V and his apprentices built the Hook Windmill in 1806, replacing an earlier "spider-legged" windmill from around 1740 at the same location. Dominy V was a local craftsman who also constructed windmills on Gardiner Island in 1795 and Shelter Island in 1810. The Hook Windmill appears to have incorporated parts from the earlier post-style windmill, including the 24-inch square center post, which was the largest seen in surviving windmills on Long Island and had mortises cut for the tenons of the former quarter bar of the original post mill.
Routine maintenance by Dominy V include the replacement of the windshaft in 1816, 1825 and 1830, along with sails, points, cogs and rounds, and replacing bearings.

The Hook Windmill was operated by Nathaniel Dominy VII and his sons from 1859 until 1908 During this time, it was listed as grinding about 5,000 bushels of grain into flour and feed, which was lower than the modern steam-powered grist mill built in Southampton in 1851 that could grind 25,000 bushels of grain. Hook was also equipped with a corn cob crusher and an elevator to transport grain from the first floor to the third floor for processing.
Charles Dominy, the son of Nathaniel Dominy VII, restored the windmill for the village to working order in 1939 and ran it until 1942.
The mill was then operated by Maurice Lester until the 1950s.

The windmill has been open as a museum in the summer.

See Also

Good Ground Windmill

List of windmills in New York

References
Notes

External links

 Hook Windmill – visiting information

Drawings

National Register of Historic Places in East Hampton (town), New York
Historic American Engineering Record in New York (state)
Windmills in New York (state)
East Hampton (village), New York
Industrial buildings and structures on the National Register of Historic Places in New York (state)
Industrial buildings completed in 1806
Buildings and structures in Suffolk County, New York
Tourist attractions in Suffolk County, New York
Museums in Suffolk County, New York
Smock mills in the United States
Windmills on the National Register of Historic Places